Ashtamudikkaayal is a 1978 Indian Malayalam film,  directed by K. P. Pillai. The film stars Prem Nazir, Jayabharathi, Adoor Bhasi and Sreelatha Namboothiri in the lead roles. The film has musical score by V. Dakshinamoorthy.

Cast
Prem Nazir
K. P. Ummer
M. G. Soman
Adoor Bhasi
Jose Prakash
Jayabharathi
Sreelatha Namboothiri
Bhavani
Mallika Sukumaran
Jagathi Sreekumar
Chandraji
Meena
T. R. Omana

Soundtrack
The music was composed by V. Dakshinamoorthy and the lyrics were written by Sreekumaran Thampi and Chirayinkeezhu Ramakrishnan Nair.

References

External links
 

1978 films
1970s Malayalam-language films